Tomáš "Vosa" Sršeň (born August 25, 1966) is a former Czechoslovakian professional ice hockey left wing who played two games in the National Hockey League for the Edmonton Oilers during the 1990–91 season. The rest of his career, which lasted from 1984 to 2011, was mainly spent in the Czech Republic. Internationally Sršeň played for the Czech national team at several international tournaments, including the 1994 Winter Olympics.

Career
Sršeň started his career with TJ Zetor Brno in 1985, and played for his home country in the 1986 World Junior Ice Hockey Championships. He was selected in the seventh round of the 1987 NHL Entry Draft by the Edmonton Oilers, but stayed in Czechoslovakia for three more seasons, playing for Zetor and for HC Dukla Jihlava

Sršeň made his National Hockey League debut for the Oilers in the 1990–91 season, but only appeared in two games for the club, registering no scoring points. He spent most of the season, and all of the next, with the minor league affiliate Cape Breton Oilers.

Sršeň returned to Europe for the 1992–93 season, playing with Leksands IF and then Rögle BK in the Swedish Elitserien. For Rögle, he won the Håkan Loob Trophy as the league's top scorer with 28 goals in the 1993–94 season. He was a member of the Czech Republic national team at the 1994 Winter Olympics and at the 1994 and 1995 World Championships. He returned to his home country during the 1994–95 season and played for HC Vsetín until 1999. During these years, his team won five consecutive championships of the Czech Extraliga.

In 1999, Sršeň joined the Essen Mosquitoes of the Deutsche Eishockey Liga, but lasted just one season before returning to the Czech Republic where he split the 1999-00 season with HC Havířov and HC Vítkovice. He then had spells in the Italian Serie A for HC Merano and in the 2nd Bundesliga in Germany for EHC Wolfsburg. Between 2002 and 2006, Sršeň divided his time between HC Havířov and Lillehammer IK in Norway, as well as a short stint with HC Olomouc. He then spent a season in Denmark with the Frederikshavn White Hawks and then played four seasons with HC Uničov of the Czech 2. Liga before retiring in 2011.

Career statistics

Regular season and playoffs

International

External links
 

1966 births
Living people
Cape Breton Oilers players
Czech expatriate sportspeople in Norway
Czech ice hockey left wingers
Czechoslovak ice hockey left wingers
HC Dukla Jihlava players
Frederikshavn White Hawks players
Edmonton Oilers draft picks
Edmonton Oilers players
Essen Mosquitoes players
Grizzlys Wolfsburg players
HC Havířov players
Ice hockey players at the 1994 Winter Olympics
HC Kometa Brno players
HC Merano players
HC Olomouc players
HC Vítkovice players
Leksands IF players
Lillehammer IK players
Olympic ice hockey players of the Czech Republic
Sportspeople from Olomouc
Rögle BK players
VHK Vsetín players
Czechoslovak expatriate ice hockey people
Expatriate ice hockey players in Canada
Czechoslovak expatriate sportspeople in Canada
Expatriate ice hockey players in Norway
Expatriate ice hockey players in Denmark
Czech expatriate sportspeople in Denmark
Czech expatriate ice hockey players in Germany
Czech expatriate sportspeople in Italy
Expatriate ice hockey players in Italy
Czech expatriate ice hockey players in Sweden